Ena Mikrofono Ki Ego (Greek: Ένα Μικρόφωνο Κι Εγώ; English: One Microphone And I) is the ninth studio album by popular Greek singer Nikos Oikonomopoulos, released on 17 December 2015 by Minos EMI. The album was number one in the Greek Albums Chart, it was certified double platinum.

Track listing

Singles
"An Ponas"
The first single is "An Ponas". The video clip of the song was released on 23 November 2015.

"Akou Na Deis"
The second single is "Akou Na Deis", released to Greek radios on 7 January 2016.

"Poion Koroidevo"
"Poion Koroidevo" is the third single, released on 19 April 2016.

Charts

Personnel
Thanasis Papageorgiou – executive producer
Dimitris Panagiotakopoulos – artwork
Stefanos Papadopoulos – photography
Giannis Ioannidis, Giorgos Antoniou – mastering

See also
 List of number-one albums in Greece

References

2015 albums
Nikos Oikonomopoulos albums
Minos EMI albums
Greek-language albums